Claude Aubrey Akins (May 25, 1926 – January 27, 1994) was an American character actor with a long career on stage, screen, and television. He was best known as Sheriff Lobo on the 1979–1981 television series B. J. and the Bear, and later The Misadventures of Sheriff Lobo, a spin-off series.

Early years
Akins was born in Nelson, Georgia, and grew up in Bedford, Indiana, the son of Maude and Ernest Akins. Film reference works said he was born in 1918, making his age at death 75; however, Akins' son said his father was 67 at the time of his death, and he is listed as Aubrey Akins in the 1940 Census, age 13. He served with the U.S. Army Signal Corps in World War II in Burma and the Philippines.

He graduated in 1949 from Northwestern University, where he had majored in theatre arts and became a member of the Lambda Chi Alpha fraternity.

Film career
As a film actor, Akins first appeared in From Here to Eternity (1953). He appeared as a seaman and shipmate of Lee Marvin's in The Caine Mutiny (1954). He portrayed prisoner Joe Burdette in Rio Bravo (starring John Wayne, Ricky Nelson, Dean Martin, and Angie Dickinson), Naval Lt. Commander Farber in Don't Give Up the Ship (starring Jerry Lewis), Sgt Kolowicz in Merrill's Marauders, Rockwell W. "Rocky" Rockman in The Devil's Brigade, the Reverend Jeremiah Brown in the movie Inherit the Wind (1960), outlaw Ben Lane in Comanche Station that same year, Seely Jones in A Distant Trumpet (1964), and the gorilla leader Aldo in Battle for the Planet of the Apes (1973), the last original Apes movie.

He had a small part in The Sea Chase with John Wayne. He appeared with Yul Brynner and Robert Fuller in the film Return of the Seven (1966) (also called Return of the Magnificent Seven and The Magnificent Seven 2), and also appeared in the movie Seasons of the Heart (1993).

Television
Akins was cast in myriad television series, including The Adventures of Superman (episode number 69, "Peril by Sea"), in which he plays a villainous conspirator, Crusader, and I Love Lucy in which he portrays himself. Much of his work was on Westerns, including Frontier, My Friend Flicka (three times), Boots and Saddles, Maverick, Northwest Passage, The Restless Gun (four times), The Sheriff of Cochise, Wagon Train (four times), Overland Trail, Frontier Circus, The Tall Man, The Rebel, The Big Valley, Daniel Boone, The Legend of Jesse James, Death Valley Days with Jane Russell, Dick Powell's Zane Grey Theatre (four times), The Rifleman (three times), Rawhide (seven times), Gunsmoke (10 times), Bonanza (four times), The Alaskans (twice), The Texan (twice), and Bat Masterson (season 1, ep 29, "The Death of Bat Masterson").

He appeared once on Richard Diamond, Private Detective, Empire, Laredo ("The Treasure of San Diablo"), the syndicated series, Pony Express (in "The Story of Julesburg" with Sebastian Cabot and James Best), and The Oregon Trail, with Rod Taylor. He was cast as Jarret Sutton in "Escape to Memphis" (1959) and as Beaudry Rawlins in "Duel on the River" (1960) on Darren McGavin's NBC series, Riverboat.

Akins played a rodeo clown convicted of armed robbery in "Killer on Horseback", an episode of the NBC anthology series Star Stage, which became the pilot episode for the syndicated police drama State Trooper, starring Rod Cameron. The episode was later broadcast on the regular series as "Rodeo Rough House". Akins also appeared in the 1963 episode "The Chooser of the Slain" on the ABC/Warner Bros. Western series, The Dakotas.

Among Akins's four appearances on NBC's Laramie with series stars John Smith and Robert Fuller was the role of former Sheriff Jim Dark in the episode "Queen of Diamonds" (September 20, 1960).

Akins was featured in two episodes of the original CBS series The Twilight Zone ("The Little People" and "The Monsters Are Due on Maple Street"). He also guest-starred in three episodes each of Combat! (fourth and fifth seasons) and The Untouchables. He made a comedic turn on Hazel, as a frustrated painter.

He appeared on Rod Cameron's early syndicated series, City Detective, Meet McGraw with Frank Lovejoy, the ABC/WB drama, The Roaring 20's, and Police Story.

Akins's other early appearances included a role as a policeman on Alfred Hitchcock Presents in "Place of Shadows" (1956) and "Reward to Finder" (1957). He played another television cop, good-natured Sheriff's Detective Phillip Dix, in the first season of the Perry Mason in "The Case of the Half-Wakened Wife" (episode 1-26) that aired March 15, 1958. He was in a first-season episode of Maverick titled "Burial Ground of the Gods" (1958) that starred Jack Kelly. In 1965, Akins played El Supremo in "The Man from U.N.C.L.E." episode, "The Very Important Zombie Affair". In 1967, Akins played Lt. Finch in The Lucy Show episode, "Lucy Meets the Law".

He portrayed prosecuting attorney Calvin Wolf opposite Carl Betz in an episode of Judd, for the Defense.

Akins was cast as Lou Myerson in the 1964 episode, "One Monday Afternoon", of the NBC education drama series, Mr. Novak, starring James Franciscus, and as Dr. Roy Kirk in an episode, "When Do They Hang the Good Samaritan?", of the CBS  political drama, Slattery's People (which starred Richard Crenna). He played a kidnapper in a 1964 episode of The Fugitive.  In 1965, he was featured in an episode of Kraft Suspense Theatre, playing a German infiltrator who went unsuspected. Also that year, Akins portrayed the head of an Irish immigrant family in The Big Valley ("The Brawlers"). Akins had an earlier role in the first season of Barnaby Jones; episode titled "Murder Go-Round".

Before his signature character Sheriff Lobo, Akins appeared as owner-operator trucker Sonny Pruitt in NBC's Movin' On, from 1974 to 1976, with Frank Converse. Akins starred in over 40 episodes of Movin' On, plus a made-for-TV movie "In Tandem". He also starred as a Nashville police detective, Stoney Huff, in the crime drama Nashville 99. Akins' best-known role of Sheriff Elroy P. Lobo had begun as a recurring character on the television series B.J. and the Bear. After becoming a recognizable name in the late 1970s, Akins did testimonial TV commercials for PoliGrip, Rollins Truck Leasing, and AAMCO Transmissions.

Akins found work in the late 1980s lending his voice talents to the work safety instructional video series, Safety Shorts, in which he expounded the virtues of workplace safety to thousands of industrial employees, offering lessons on the importance of lockout/tagout procedures, personal protective equipment, and the MSDS documentation process. Akins made a golfing video with Ron Masak, entitled Tom Kite and Friends.

Akins also made a latter-day appearance on In the Heat of the Night, starring Carroll O'Connor.

Death
Akins died of stomach cancer in Pasadena, California on January 27, 1994, at the age of 67. He was cremated and his ashes were returned to Altadena.

Legacy
The Claude Akins Memorial Golf Classic, a six-person scramble-format golf tournament, takes place at Otis Park Golf Course in Bedford, Indiana, in August or September of each year.
Proceeds from the event go to the Akins Scholarship and the Bedford Recreation Foundation Scholarship, given every year to a graduating senior at Bedford North Lawrence High School, as well as many projects involving recreation and improvements.

Selected filmography

Film
Man in the Saddle (1951)
From Here to Eternity (1953) as Sgt. 'Baldy' Dhom (uncredited)
Bitter Creek (1954) as Vance Morgan - Henchman
Witness to Murder (1954) as Police Officer (uncredited)
The Caine Mutiny (1954) as Seaman Dlugatch aka 'Horrible'
The Raid (1954) as Lt. Ramsey (uncredited)
Shield for Murder (1954) as Fat Michaels
Down Three Dark Streets (1954) as Matty Pavelich
The Human Jungle (1954) as George Mandy
The Adventures of Hajji Baba (1954) as Chief Executioner's Aide (uncredited)
The Sea Chase (1955) as Winkler
Man with the Gun (1955) as Jim Reedy (uncredited)
Battle Stations (1956) as Marty Brennan
The Proud and Profane (1956) as Big Soldier (uncredited)
Johnny Concho (1956) as Lem
The Burning Hills (1956) as Ben Hindeman
The Sharkfighters (1956) as Chief 'Gordy' Gordon
Hot Summer Night (1957) as Truck Driver
The Kettles on Old MacDonald's Farm (1957) as Pete Logan
The Lonely Man (1957) as Blackburn
Joe Dakota (1957) as Aaron Grant
The Defiant Ones (1958) as Mack
Onionhead (1958) as Poznicki
Rio Bravo (1959) as Joe Burdette
Bat Masterson (1959) as Jack Fontana
Porgy and Bess (1959) as Detective
Don't Give Up the Ship (1959) as Lt. Cmdr. Farber
Hound-Dog Man (1959) as Hog Peyson
Yellowstone Kelly (1959) as Sergeant
Comanche Station (1960) as Ben Lane
Inherit the Wind (1960) as Rev. Jeremiah Brown
Claudelle Inglish (1961) as S.T. Crawford
Merrill's Marauders (1962) as Sgt. Kolowicz
Black Gold (1962) as Chick Carrington
A Distant Trumpet (1964) as Seely Jones
The Killers (1964) as Earl Sylvester
Ride Beyond Vengeance (1966) as Elwood Coates
Incident at Phantom Hill (1966) as Krausman
Return of the Seven (1966) as Frank
First to Fight (1967) as Capt. Mason
Waterhole #3 (1967) as Sgt. Henry Foggers
The Devil's Brigade (1968) as Pvt. Rocky Rockman
The Great Bank Robbery (1969) as Slade
A Man Called Sledge (1970) as Hooker
Flap (1970) as Lobo Jackson
The Night Stalker (1972) as Sheriff Butcher
Skyjacked (1972) as Sgt. Ben Puzo
Battle for the Planet of the Apes (1973) as General Aldo
Timber Tramps (1975) as Matt
Tentacoli (1977) as Sheriff Robards
Killer on Board (1977) as Oscar Billingham
Tarantulas: The Deadly Cargo (1977) as Bert Springer
Concrete Cowboys (1979) as Woody Stone
The Baron and the Kid (1984) as Harley
Battle of the Monster Trucks (1985)
Monster in the Closet (1986) as Sheriff Sam Ketchem
Manhunt for Claude Dallas (1986) as Bill Pogue
The Curse (1987) as Nathan
Pushed Too Far (1988) as Sheriff Jim Forrest
The Gambler Returns: The Luck of the Draw (1991, TV Movie) as President Theodore Roosevelt
Incident at Victoria Falls (1991, TV Movie) as Theodore Roosevelt
Where Evil Lives (1991) as Jack Devlin
Falling from Grace (1992) as Speck Parks
Seasons of the Heart (1993) as Pastor William Clay
Twisted Fear (1994) as Detective Lucky Douglas

Television

Dragnet - episode "The Big Drink" - Ellis (1954); episode "The Big Mistress" - Sgt. Jack McCreadie (1954)Tr
Gunsmoke - 10 episodes - various (1955-1972)
The Adventures of Superman - episode "Peril by Sea" - Ace Miller (1956)
I Love Lucy - episode "Desert Island" - (1956)
The Adventures of Jim Bowie - episode "Land Jumpers -Manion" - a settler (1956); episode "A Grave for Jim Bowie" - Miciah "Big" Hart (1958)
Sheriff of Cochise - episode "Manhunt" - Harry Clegg (1957)
Have Gun – Will Travel - episode "The Great Mojave Case" - Dever (1957)
The Restless Gun - episode "Trail to Sunset" - West Flagler (1957)
The Restless Gun - episode "Thicker Than Water" - Mr. Marlowe (1957)
The Restless Gun - episode "The Gold Buckle" - Lex Springer (1957)
The Adventures of McGraw - episode "Mojave" - Jim Bennett (1957)
Wagon Train - episode "The John Cameron Story" - Rich Tacker (1957)
Tales of Wells Fargo - 5 episodes - various (1957–1961)
Cheyenne - episode "The Long Search" - Sheriff Bob Walters (1958)
 Wagon Train - episode "The Monty Britton Story" - Garth Redmond (1958)
Perry Mason Season 1 Episode 26 "The case of the Half-Wakened Wife" (1958)Maverick - episode "Burial Ground of the Gods" - Paisley Briggs (1958)The Rifleman - episode "The Safe Guard" - Floyd Doniger (1958)Yancy Derringer - episodes "Gallatin Street" and "Collectors Item" - Toby Cook (1958-1959)77 Sunset Strip - episode "Lovely Alibi" - Ed Bird (1959)The Restless Gun - episode "Melany" (1959)Bat Masterson - episode "The Death of Bat Masterson" - Jack Fontana (1959)Dick Powell's Zane Grey Theatre - episode "Ransom" - "Simmy" the Comanchero (1960)The Untouchables- episodes The Unhired Assassin part 1 as Jake'Dodo'Ryan (1960), The Monkey Wrench as Karl Hansa (1962), The Spoiler as Vince Majesky (1963)Laramie - episode "Death Wind", s1 ep20 - Sgt. Maj. Tom Cole (1960)Pony Express - episode "The Story of Juiesberg" (1960)Overland Trail - episode "Fire in the Hole" - Jumbo (1960)Wanted: Dead or Alive - episode "Prison Trail" - Jack Kelly (1960)The Rebel – episode "The Waiting" – Tom Hall (1960)Wagon Train - episode "The Roger Bigelow Story" - Wes Varney (1960)Riverboat - episode "Duel on the River" - Beaudry Rawlins (1960)Bonanza - episodes "Desert Justice" (1960) as Marshal Emmett Dowd, "The Mill" (1960) as Ezekiel (1960), "Sam Hill" (1961) as Sam Hill and "The Deserter" (1962) as Col. Edward J. Dunwoody
 The Twilight Zone - episodes "The Monsters Are Due on Maple Street" as Steve Brand (1960) and "The Little People" as Commander Fletcher (1962)Wagon Train - episode "The Selena Hartnell Story" - Will Cotrell  (1961)Rawhide - episode "The Sendoff" - Mr. Karse  (1961)Laramie - 4 episodes - various (1960-1963)The Fugitive - Season 1 Episode 27 - Ralph Simmons (1964)Daniel Boone (1965) - as Toka in S1 E17 · "A Place of 1,000 Spirits"
Gunsmoke - "Bad Lady From Brookline" - as Sy (1965)
The F.B.I. - episode "How to Murder an Iron Horse" - Ben Gambriella (1965)
The Big Valley - "The Brawlers" - (1965)
The Man from U.N.C.L.E. - "The Very Important Zombie Affair" - El Supremo (1965)
A Man Called Shenandoah - episode "Obion-1866" - Frody Brown (1965)
Branded - episode "Vindicator" - Ned Travis (1965)
Hazel - episode "But Is It Art?" - Milwaukee Ames (1966)
Combat! - episodes "Ask Me No Questions" as Mastin, "Ollie Joe" as Charlie Pelton and "Nightmare on the Red Ball Run" as Rosie (1966–1967)
Laredo - episodes "Limit of the Law", "The Treasure of San Diablo", "Hey Diddle Diddle", "A Question of Guilt", and "Walk Softly" - Cotton BuckMeister (1966–1967)
The Guns of Will Sonnett - episode "Ride the Long Trail" - Turnbaugh (1967)
Hondo - episode "Hondo and The Gladiators" - Brock (1967)
The Lucy Show - episode "Lucy Meets the Law" (1967)
The F.B.I. - episode "Dark Journey" - Jason Peale (1972)
McMillan & Wife - episode "The Face of Murder" - Freddie O'Neal (1972)
The Rookies - episode "Margin For Error" - Officer Buck Sanborn (1972)
The Streets of San Francisco - episode "A String of Puppets" - Bob Mason (1972) 
Cannon - episode 3x05, "Target in the Mirror" - Lt. Bill Blaine (1973)
Barnaby Jones - episode "Murder-Go-Round" - Eli Rile (1973)
Mission: Impossible - episode "Speed" - Sam Hibbling (1973)
Police Story - 3 episodes - various (1973-1978)
In Tandem - TV movie (pilot for Movin' On) - Sonny Pruitt (1974)
Movin' On - 45 episodes - Sonny Pruitt (1974–1976)
McCloud - episode "The Colorado Cattle Caper" (1974)
Mannix - episode "Mask for a Charade" - Sgt. Al Reardon (1974)
The Rhinemann Exchange (1977) (TV miniseries) as Walter Kendall
B. J. and the Bear - at least 5 episodes - Sheriff Elroy P. Lobo (1978–1979)
The Misadventures of Sheriff Lobo - 38 episodes - Sheriff Elroy P. Lobo - (1978–1979)
Concrete Cowboys - episode "Concrete Cowboys" - Woody Stone (1979)
Fantasy Island - episode "Lillian Russell/The Lagoon" - Calvin Pearson (1981)
Darkroom - episode "Uncle George" - Bert Haskell (1981)  
The Master - episode "Max" - Mr. Trumball (January 20, 1984) 
Murder, She Wrote - 4 episodes - Ethan Cragg (1984)
Tall Tales & Legends - episode "Pecos Bill" - Grandpa/Narrator (1986)
Dream West - TV mini-series - Tom Fitzpatrick (1986)
Matlock - episode "The Thoroughbred" - Sam Taylor (1989)
Hunter (1984 American TV Series) - episode "The Legion" - Andy (1990)
In the Heat of the Night - episode "An Eye for An Eye" - Benjamin Sloan (1991)
Eerie, Indiana - episode "The Hole in the Wall Gang" - Grungy Bill (1992)

References

External links

 
 
 
 Safety Shorts 

1926 births
1994 deaths
American male film actors
American male television actors
American male stage actors
Male Western (genre) film actors
Northwestern University School of Communication alumni
People from Cherokee County, Georgia
People from Pickens County, Georgia
Male actors from Georgia (U.S. state)
Deaths from cancer in California
Deaths from stomach cancer
20th-century American male actors
People from Bedford, Indiana
Male actors from Indiana
United States Army personnel of World War II
Military personnel from Georgia (U.S. state)
Western (genre) television actors